John Chibuike (born 10 October 1988) is a Nigerian footballer who played as a secondary striker.

Career
Starting his career in Enugu Rangers and made the senior team in the 2008-2009 season, in 2009 prior to the start of Allsvenskan he was bought by BK Häcken. Mainly being used as a defender by Rangers, after his arrival in Häcken he has been used more as a midfielder.

John Chibuike had a quite soft start in BK Häcken, but soon spectators around the venues saw that he had something extra. During his first season – 2010 he played as a midfielder and showed both good defensive and offensive skills and specially a good vision and technique. He made 27 out of 30 games during the season scoring 3 goals and making three assists.

In the start of Allsvenskan, season 2011 it became apparent that Chibuike had improved even more. Allsvenskan topscorer – and club fellow Mathias Ranégie said he was the team’s most import important player and that he very soon could see Chibuike playing on a European toplevel.

On 29 August 2011, Chibuike signed a four-year contract with Norwegian side Rosenborg where he played behind a main striker.

In the summer of 2014, Chibuike moved from Rosenborg to Turkish side Gaziantepspor, signing a four-year contract.

In August 2016, Chibuike signed for AIK.

Career statistics

References

External links
 
 
 
 

1988 births
Living people
Association football forwards
Nigerian footballers
Rangers International F.C. players
BK Häcken players
Rosenborg BK players
Gaziantepspor footballers
AIK Fotboll players
Hapoel Tel Aviv F.C. players
Samsunspor footballers
FC Irtysh Pavlodar players
Falkenbergs FF players
Eliteserien players
Allsvenskan players
Süper Lig players
Israeli Premier League players
TFF First League players
Kazakhstan Premier League players
Nigerian expatriate footballers
Expatriate footballers in Sweden
Nigerian expatriate sportspeople in Sweden
Expatriate footballers in Norway
Nigerian expatriate sportspeople in Norway
Expatriate footballers in Turkey
Nigerian expatriate sportspeople in Turkey
Expatriate footballers in Israel
Nigerian expatriate sportspeople in Israel
Expatriate footballers in Kazakhstan
Nigerian expatriate sportspeople in Kazakhstan
Footballers from Enugu